This is a list of cathedrals in Cape Verde.

List 
Roman Catholic cathedrals:
 Pro-Cathedral of Our Lady of the Light, Mindelo
 Pro-Cathedral of Our Lady of Grace, Praia

References

See also 
 List of cathedrals

Cape Verde
Cathedrals
List
Cathedrals